San Antonio Island is an island located in the eastern part of the Ebro Delta, belonging to the municipality of Deltebre, Catalonia, Spain.

The island consists of dunes and marshes and has a very rich biodiversity. San Antonio Island and nearby Buda Island are protected areas included in Delta del Ebro Natural Park.

References

Islands of Spain